Robin Maxwell (born February 26, 1948) is an American historical novelist who specializes in the Tudor period. She is also a screenwriter and political blogger.

Maxwell was raised in Plainfield, New Jersey, and graduated from Tufts University. She and her husband Max, live in Pioneertown, California.

Novels
 The Secret Diary of Anne Boleyn (April 1997) 
 The Queen’s Bastard (April 1999) 
 Virgin: Prelude to the Throne (June 2001) 
 The Wild Irish: Elizabeth I and the Pirate O’Malley (October 2003) 
 To the Tower Born: the Lost Princes (September 2005) 
 Mademoiselle Boleyn (November 2007) 
 Signora da Vinci (January 2009) 
 O, Juliet (February 2010) 
 Jane: The Woman Who Loved Tarzan (September 2012) 
 Atlantos (The Early Erthe Chronicles ) (Volume 1) (July 2015)

References

External links
 Robin Maxwell's official website
 Robin Maxwell's blog
Robin Maxwell's podcast - An Alien in Hollywood

1948 births
Living people
American women novelists
Writers of historical fiction set in the early modern period
Writers from Plainfield, New Jersey
21st-century American women writers